Survivor Activating Factor Enhancement (SAFE) is a metabolic pathway. It is an intrinsic protective signaling programme to limit cell death activated by the heart. This pathway allows ischaemic postconditioning that helps protect against reperfusion injury. This path involves the activation of a transcription factor called signal transducer and activator of transcription 3 (STAT3).  The SAFE pathway interacts with the reperfusion injury salvage kinase pathway to convey the ischemic postconditioning stimulus from the cell surface to the mitochondria, where many of the prosurvival and death signals appear to converge.

Activation 
A 2011 study concludes, “Our data demonstrate that both melatonin and resveratrol, as found in red wine, protect the heart in an experimental model of myocardial infarction via the SAFE pathway.”

References 

Metabolic pathways